African Action Congress (AAC) is a left-wing, Nigerian political party created by a Nigerian 2019 presidential aspirant and Publisher at Sahara Reporters; Omoyele Sowore in a bid to contest in the 2019 general elections in the Federal Republic of Nigeria as President.

The Party was launched in Abuja, the country's capital on the 15th of August, 2018. The slogan of the party is, Take it back-action. The Party National Chairman recognized by INEC is Omoyele Sowore. On Monday 13 May 2019 AAC announces expulsion of Leonard Nzenwa and suspension of other individuals for financial impropriety and anti-party activities.

References

2018 establishments in Nigeria
Political parties established in 2018
Political parties in Nigeria
Progressive International
Progressive parties